Cornelia Barbaro Gritti (1719 – 19 April 1808), was a Venetian poet and salon-holder.

She was the daughter of Bernardo Barbaro and Elisabetta Lucchini and married in 1736 to Giovannantonio Gritti.

References
 http://www.treccani.it/enciclopedia/cornelia-barbaro-gritti_(Dizionario_Biografico)/
 http://www.treccani.it/enciclopedia/tag/cornelia-barbaro-gritti/

1719 births
1808 deaths
Republic of Venice poets
18th-century Italian women writers
18th-century Venetian writers
Italian salon-holders
Republic of Venice entertainers
18th-century Venetian women
18th-century Venetian people
Republic of Venice women writers